Balrath Cross is a wayside cross and National Monument located in County Meath, Ireland.

Location

References

Archaeological sites in County Meath
National Monuments in County Meath